A Christmas Carol is a musical with music by Alan Menken, lyrics by Lynn Ahrens, and book by Mike Ockrent and Lynn Ahrens. The musical is based on Charles Dickens' 1843 novella of the same name. The show was presented annually at New York City's Theater at Madison Square Garden from December 1, 1994, to December 27, 2003.

Productions

Madison Square Garden, New York (1994–2003) 
A Christmas Carol premiered on December 1, 1994. It was performed annually in December at the Theater at Madison Square Garden in Madison Square Garden from December 1994 until December 2003.

The original 1994 production was directed by Mike Ockrent with choreography by Susan Stroman, sets by Tony Walton, costumes by William Ivey Long, lighting by Jules Fisher and Peggy Eisenhauer, sound by Tony Meola, projections by Wendall K. Harrington, and musical direction by Paul Gemignani. Walter Charles played Ebenezer Scrooge.

Terrence Mann, Tony Randall, Hal Linden, Roddy McDowall (in his final role), F. Murray Abraham, Frank Langella, Tim Curry, Tony Roberts, Roger Daltrey and Jim Dale have all played the role of Ebenezer Scrooge in subsequent productions of A Christmas Carol.

2004 television film 
In 2004, the production was adapted for television and produced by Hallmark Entertainment for NBC. It was directed by Arthur Allan Seidelman and features Kelsey Grammer as Ebenezer Scrooge, Jason Alexander as Jacob Marley, Jane Krakowski as the Ghost of Christmas Past, Jesse L. Martin as the Ghost of Christmas Present, Geraldine Chaplin as the Ghost of Christmas Yet To Be, and Jennifer Love Hewitt as Emily (named Belle in the book), Scrooge's former fiancée.

London concerts (2016–2020) 
The musical made its London premiere on Monday December 19, 2016 at the Lyceum Theatre as a concert production played by London Musical Theatre Orchestra and produced by James Yeoburn and Stuart Matthew Price for United Theatrical. It starred Robert Lindsay as Ebenezer Scrooge, Alex Gaumond as Bob Cratchit, Carrie Hope Fletcher and her sister-in-law Giovanna Fletcher as Emily and Mrs Cratchit, Madalena Alberto as the Ghost of Christmas Past, Hugh Maynard as the Ghost of Christmas Present, Norman Bowman as Jacob Marley, Peter Polycarpou as Mr Fezziwig, and John Addison as Fred Anderson.

The concert production was again at the Lyceum on December 11 and 18, 2017, with Lindsay returning to the role of Scrooge.

On 17 December 2018, the production returned to the Lyceum Theatre again with Griff Rhys Jones as Scrooge.

From 7 December 2020 a new production of the staged concert with the London Musical Theatre Orchestra opened at the Dominion Theatre during the COVID-19 pandemic where the theatre was socially distanced, starring Brian Conley as Scrooge, Matt Willis as Bob Cratchit, Jacqueline Jossa as Emily/Ghost of Christmas Future, Lucie Jones as the Ghost of Christmas Past, Sandra Marvin as Mrs Fezziwigg, Martyn Ellis as Mr Fezziwigg, Cedric Neal as Ghost of Christmas Present, Jeremy Secomb as Jacob Marley, Rebecca Lock as Mrs Cratchit and Sam Oladeinde as Fred Anderson/Young Scrooge. The run was due to close on 2 January 2021, however due to the Government's tier 3 restrictions in London, the run finished early on 15 December 2020.

Yearly MSG Casts

Long Runs: Gail Pennington appeared all 10 years in the EnsemblePaul Kandel appeared as the Ghost of Jacob Marley for 9 consecutive years, the longest any cast member appeared in one speaking role

Synopsis
The opening numbers are "The Years Are Passing By" and "Jolly, Rich, and Fat". In later productions the two numbers are combined as "Jolly Good Time." Scrooge first encounters the three ghosts of Christmas in their real-world guises as a lamplighter (Past), a charity show barker (Present), and a blind beggar woman (Future) ("Nothing to Do With Me"). Scrooge's long-suffering employee Bob Cratchit, and Bob's son Tiny Tim, purchase a Christmas chicken ("You Mean More to Me").

The visit of the ghost of Jacob Marley ("Link By Link"), features a half-dozen singing, dancing spirits presented with various levels of makeup and special effects. One of these ghosts in this version is known to be an old colleague of Scrooge and Marley's, Mr. Haynes, who was said to be "mean to the bone", resulting in his charred skeleton. Other puns include a spirit with a safe embedded in his chest, who "never had a heart".

The Ghost of Christmas Past reinforces the character's signature theme of illuminating Scrooge's worldview ("The Lights of Long Ago"). One notable departure from Dickens' novella in this portion of the film is its depiction of Ebenezer Scrooge's father, identified as John William Scrooge, being sentenced to debtors' prison while his horrified family looks on; this scene was inspired by an actual occurrence from Dickens' own childhood.

The Ghost of Christmas Present ("Abundance and Charity" and "Christmas Together"), makes his point that Christmas is a time for celebration, generosity, and fellowship. The former takes place at a fantastical version of the charity show he was seen promoting on Christmas Eve, and the latter whisks Scrooge on a tour of London that includes the homes of his nephew Fred, his clerk Bob Cratchit, and Mr. Smythe, a recently widowed client of Scrooge's lending house.

The entire Christmas Future ("Dancing On Your Grave", "You Mean More to Me (Reprise)", and "Yesterday, Tomorrow, and Today"), culminates in Scrooge's awakening in his bedroom on Christmas morning.

"What a Day, What a Sky" bookends "Nothing to Do With Me", dramatizing Scrooge's new outlook as he races through the streets of London making amends. The show concludes with a reprise of "Christmas Together" featuring the entire cast.

Scenes and musical numbers

1994 version

Time: London, 1880
 "Overture" — Orchestra
Scene 1: A Graveyard Near St. Paul's Cathedral, Christmas Eve
 "The Years Are Passing By" — Grave Digger
Scene 2: The Royal Exchange
 "Jolly, Rich and Fat" — Three Charity Men, Smythe Family, Businessmen, Wives and Children
 "Nothing To Do With Me" — Scrooge and Cratchit
Scene 3: The Street
 "Street Song (Nothing To Do With Me)" — People of London, Scrooge, Fred, Jonathon, Sandwich Board Man, Lamplighter, Blind Hag and Jack Smythe
Scene 4: Scrooge's House
 "Link By Link" — Marley's Ghost, Scrooge and Ghosts
Scene 5: Scrooge's Bed Chamber
 "The Lights of Long Ago" – Ghost of Christmas Past
Scene 6: The Law Courts
 "God Bless Us, Everyone" – Scrooge's Mother, Fan at 6 and Scrooge at 8
Scene 7: The Factory
 "A Place Called Home" – Scrooge at 12, Fan at 10 and Scrooge

Scene 8: Fezziwig's Banking House
 "Mr. Fezziwig's Annual Christmas Ball" — Fezziwig, Mrs. Fezziwig and Guests
 "A Place Called Home (Reprise)" — Emily, Scrooge at 18 and Scrooge
Scene 9: Montage
 "The Lights of Long Ago (Part II)" — Scrooge at 18, Young Marley, Emily and People from Scrooge's Past
Scene 10: A Starry Night
 "Abundance and Charity" – Ghost of Christmas Present, Scrooge and The Christmas Gifts
Scene 11: All Over London
 "Christmas Together" – Tiny Tim, The Cratchit's Fred, Sally, Scrooge and People of London
Scene 12: The Graveyard
 "Dancing On Your Grave" – Grave Diggers, Ghost of Christmas Future, Monks, Businessmen, Mrs. Mops, Undertakers, Old Joe, Mr. Smythe and Cratchit
 "Yesterday, Tomorrow and Today" – Scrooge, Angels and Children of London
Scene 13: Scrooge's Bed Chamber
 "The Years Are Passing By (Reprise)" – Jonathon
Scene 14: The Street, Christmas Day
 "Nothing To Do With Me (Reprise)" – Scrooge
 "Christmas Together (Reprise)" – The People of London
 "God Bless Us, Everyone (Finale)" – The Company

Final version

Time: London, 1880
 "Overture" — Orchestra
Scene 1: The Royal Exchange
 "A Jolly Good Time" — Charity Men, Smythe Family, Businessmen, Wives and Children
 "Nothing To Do With Me" — Scrooge and Cratchit
Scene 2: The Street
 "You Mean More to Me" – Cratchit and Tiny Tim
 "Street Song (Nothing To Do With Me)" — People of London, Scrooge, Fred, Jonathon, Sandwichboard Man, Lamplighter, Blind Hag and Grace Smythe
Scene 3: Scrooge's House
 "Link By Link" — Marley's Ghost, Scrooge and Ghosts
Scene 4: Scrooge's Bed Chamber
 "The Lights of Long Ago" – Ghost of Christmas Past
Scene 5: The Law Courts
 "God Bless Us, Everyone" – Scrooge's Mother
Scene 6: The Factory
 "A Place Called Home" – Scrooge at 12, Fan and Scrooge
Scene 7: Fezziwig's Banking House
 "Fezziwig's Annual Christmas Ball" — Fezziwig, Mrs. Fezziwig and Guests
 "A Place Called Home (Reprise)" — Emily, Scrooge at 18 and Scrooge

Scene 8: Scrooge and Marley's
 "The Lights of Long Ago (Part II)" — Scrooge at 18, Young Marley, Emily, People from Scrooge's Past and Ghost of Christmas Past
Scene 9: A Starry Night
 "Abundance and Charity" – Ghost of Christmas Present, Scrooge and The Christmas Gifts
Scene 10: All Over London
 "Christmas Together" – Tiny Tim, The Cratchit's, Ghost of Christmas Present, Fred, Sally, Scrooge and People of London
Scene 11: The Graveyard
 "Dancing On Your Grave" – Ghost of Christmas Yet-To-Be, Scrooge, Monks, Businessmen, Mrs. Mops, Undertakers, Old Joe and Cratchit
 "Yesterday, Tomorrow and Today" – Scrooge and Angels
Scene 12: Scrooge's Bed Chamber
 "London Town Carol" – Jonathon
Scene 13: The Street, Christmas Day
 "Nothing To Do With Me (Reprise)" – Scrooge
 "Christmas Together (Reprise)" – The People of London
 "God Bless Us, Everyone (Finale)" – The Company

Instrumentation
The orchestration for A Christmas Carol consists of five woodwinds, one French horn, three trumpets in B-Flat (one doubling on flugelhorn), two trombones (the second doubling tuba), a drum kit, a percussion section, two synthesizers, one harp (doubling synthesizer) and strings. The first woodwind player doubles on flute, piccolo, clarinet in B-flat and soprano saxophone, the second on oboe, English horn, clarinet in B-flat and tenor saxophone, the third on clarinets in E-flat and B-flat, flute, piccolo, tin whistle and alto saxophone, the fourth bass clarinet in B-flat, flute and clarinet in B-flat, and the fifth on bassoon, clarinet in B-flat, flute and bass saxophone.

Reception
David Richards reviewed the 1994 production for The New York Times writing:

Of the score, Richards wrote: "After the spectacle, the score by Mr. Menken (with lyrics by Ms. Ahrens) is the production's major drawing card." Richards continued, "The eye is courted at every turn, the special effects come on a regular basis and the street scenes don't lack for warmly dressed bodies and the odd beggar. At the end, snow falls in the hall as well as onstage, which so thrilled an incredulous 8-year-old boy seated near me that he got up and danced in the aisle."

Lawrence Van Gelder reviewed the 2002 production for The New York Times writing, "Music, dance, colorful costumes and atmospheric scenery – all intended to make holiday theatergoing a pleasant family experience – are marshaled here to satisfying effect." Of F. Murray Abraham's performance, Gelder wrote: "Far from the terrifying figure who made blind men's dogs tug their owners into doorways and up courts, Mr. Abraham can scarcely contain the good cheer waiting to burst out in little bits of business before his ghostly encounters."

Jeremy Gerard reviewed the 1994 production for "Variety" writing, "The show begins with a thunderous percussive explosion — rumbling organ, crashing cymbals, blaring brass — on Tony Walton's wraparound London cityscape set that's so big you could park Norma Desmond's mansion in there and never notice it." Gerard continues:

Noting the costume design, Gerard said: "For a later dance number, a Christmas ball stunningly set in Fezziwig's Banking House, costume designer William Ivey Long (another "Crazy" alum) has outdone himself, which is saying something, as gown after wildly colorful gown makes its entrance and has its spin.

See also
 Adaptations of A Christmas Carol
 A Christmas Carol

References

External links
 Musical Numbers and Scenes at guidetomusicaltheatre.com
 A Christmas Carol at the Music Theatre International website

1994 musicals
Musicals based on A Christmas Carol
Musicals by Alan Menken
Musicals by Lynn Ahrens